John III (1469 – 14 June 1516) was jure uxoris King of Navarre from 1484 until his death, as husband and co-ruler with Queen Catherine.

He was a son of Alain I, Lord of Albret and his wife Frances, Countess of Périgord.

King of Navarre

Marriage to Queen Catherine and accession to the throne
He became King of Navarre and Count of Foix by virtue of his 1484 marriage to Queen Catherine (1470–1517), successor of her brother Francis Phoebus in 1483. He shared with Catherine tasks related to the government of the kingdom, but his rule was marked by the guardianship of Catherine's mother Magdalena de Valois up to 1494—she died in 1495—and persistent diplomatic and military pressure of Ferdinand II of Aragon over the Crown of Navarre, supported on the ground by the Beaumont party of Navarre.

He and Catherine were crowned as monarchs in Pamplona on 10 January 1494. In the run-up to the ceremony, Louis of Beaumont—count of Lerín—had taken over and ransacked the stronghold. On Christmas 1493, the count blocked the access of the king and queen to the capital city, but after a fleeting peace agreement was reached, the ceremony was held. In the week-long festival following the crowning ceremony, John III and his father are referred to in Basque language verses as Labrit, their usual naming in Navarre—also at Olite in 1493, document written in Romanic language.

The kingdom invaded
In 1512, Navarre was invaded by a combined Castilian-Aragonese army sent by Ferdinand II of Aragon, whose second wife was Germaine de Foix (1490–1538), a cousin of Queen Catherine. The Castilian troops commanded by the duke of Alba crossed the Pyrénées onto Lower Navarre capturing St-Jean-Pied-de-Port on 10 September 1512 and wreaking havoc across much of the merindad. There the Castilians were doggedly opposed by lords loyal to John III and Catherine of Navarre, but the Castilians retained St-Jean-Pied-de-Port and its hinterland. Following the invasion, Navarre south of the Pyrenees was annexed to Castile nominally as an autonomous kingdom (aeque principalis) by the victorious Ferdinand after taking an oath to respect the Navarrese laws and institutions (1515).

The royal family took shelter in Béarn, a royal Pyrenean domain and principality contiguous to Lower Navarre. The Parliament of Navarre and the States-General of Béarn had passed in 1510 a bill to create a confederation with a view to ensuring a better defence against external aggression. The capital city of Béarn was Pau, which John III and Catherine took as their main base along with Orthez and Tarbes in their last period.

Reconquest attempt and death
After the Aragonese king Ferdinand's death in January 1516, the king John III mustered an army in Sauveterre-de-Béarn made up of Navarrese exiles and men from all over his domains, especially from Béarn, but the total figure of combatants amounted to no more than several hundreds. The advance of the two columns led by Pedro, Marshal of Navarre was stopped by the Castilians right on the Pyrénées due to spies informing Cardinal Cisneros. The reconquest attempt was flawed.

Depressed by the defeats and adverse diplomatic results, John III died at the castle of Esgouarrabaque in Monein, Béarn, on 14 June 1516 after lying gripped by fatal fevers. Up to the last moment he struggled to get Navarre back from the Spanish, urging his wife, Queen Catherine, to send a representative to the Cortes of Castile to demand the restoration of the kingdom of Navarre. Despite his wish to be buried at the Santa Maria Cathedral of Pamplona, the permanent Spanish occupation prevented that. His corpse rests instead at the Cathedral of Lescar along with Queen Catherine, who outlived him only a few months.

Family
John and Catherine of Navarre had:
Anne (19 May 1492 – 15 August 1532)
Magdalena (29 March 1494 – May 1504)
Catherine (1495 – November 1532), abbess of the Trinity at Caen
Jean (15 June 1496 – last mentioned in November 1496)
Quiteria (1499 – September/October 1536), abbess at Montivilliers
a stillborn son in 1500
Andrew Phoebus (14 October 1501 – 17 April 1503)
Henry II (18 April 1503 – 25 May 1555), King of Navarre 
Buenaventura (14 July 1505 – 1510/1511)
Martin (c. 1506 – last mentioned in 1512)
Francis (1508 – last mentioned in 1512)
Charles (12 December 1510 – September 1528), captured during the Siege of Naples and died as a prisoner of war
Isabella (1513/1514 – last mentioned in 1555), married to Rene I, Viscount of Rohan

References

Sources

External links

1469 births
1516 deaths
15th-century Navarrese monarchs
16th-century Navarrese monarchs
Jure uxoris kings
Burials at Lescar Cathedral
House of Albret
Counts of Périgord
Heirs apparent who never acceded